Rough Around the Edges: Live From Madison Square Garden is an album by American stand-up comedian and actor Dane Cook. It was released on November 13, 2007, on both CD and DVD.

Released on Thanksgiving weekend, Rough Around the Edges: Live From Madison Square Garden  debuted at #11 and sold 90,000 copies in its first week; Retaliation had sold  86,000 in its first week but debuted at #4.

On the "Your Mom's House Podcast", Dane Cook admitted to improvising about 50% of this.

Track listing
Intro – 1:56
Benson's Animal Farm – 5:13
Regrets – 4:59
TiTo – 1:50
War Flute – 4:28
Copy Machine – 2:42
15¢ – 4:11
Pedophiles – 5:42
Mannequin Sex – 2:13
Herpolie Urpolies – 4:25
A Condom? – 7:09
Come to Fruition – 6:14
Video Game Strip Club – 6:06
Motorcycle Helmet – 4:15
What Do You Want Me to Do to You? – 4:40

Charts

Weekly charts

Year-end charts

References

Dane Cook albums
2007 live albums
Comedy Central Records live albums
Stand-up comedy albums
Spoken word albums by American artists
Albums recorded at Madison Square Garden
2000s comedy albums